Lefter Küçükandonyadis (Lefteris Antoniadis; 22 December 1925 – 13 January 2012) was a Turkish professional footballer of Greek descent, who played as a forward. He is often recognized as one of the greatest strikers to play for Fenerbahçe and Turkey. Having won several regional and national championship titles with Fenerbahçe and becoming Turkish top scorer twice in his career, he left an imprint on the history of the club. Lefter is one of a few players whose names are included in the Fenerbahçe Anthem. He was also known as "Ordinaryüs" (professor of professors) in Turkey.

Club career

Lefter started his footballing career on Büyükada (an island in Istanbul) but professionally played first with Taksim SK, a club based in the European part of Istanbul. He transferred to Fenerbahçe in 1947, achieving instant success. He won the National Division championship in 1950, his first nationwide championship title with the club, becoming the Turkish top scorer in the same edition.  He was one of the first Turkish footballers to play abroad, playing during 1951–1953 for ACF Fiorentina in Italy and OGC Nice in France. Returning to Fenerbahçe, he won two Istanbul League titles and later, after the start of the Turkish Super League, three Turkish League (1959, 1961 and 1964) titles. In the 1947–48 and 1953–54 seasons, he became the leading goalscorer of the Istanbul League. Overall, he scored a total of 423 goals in 615 games for Fenerbahçe. After ending his career in Turkey in 1964, he played a single season in Greece with AEK Athens at the age of 39. He scored twice in an away 7–1 victory against Apollon Smyrnis and became the eldest goalscorer in the history of the club. These goals also made his the eldest goalscorer in the history of Greek Championship, until he was surpassed by Tasos Mitropoulos in 1997. He participated in only five games in the season, as an injury in the match against Iraklis forced his retirement.

International career

Küçükandonyadis was capped 46 times for the Turkish national football team, 9 as the captain. He also played at the 1948 Summer Olympics, and the 1954 FIFA World Cup netting in two goals, one against West Germany and the other against South Korea. He scored 21 goals for the national team and was the top scorer for Turkey until overtaken by Hakan Şükür. He was the first Turkish football player to receive the "Golden Honor Medal" from the Turkish Football Federation for having played for the national selection in 50 international matches.

Managerial career
Lefter coached Egaleo in Greece and Johannesburg in South Africa. He later returned to Turkey to coach clubs, mostly Samsunspor, Orduspor, Mersin İdman Yurdu, and Boluspor.

After football 
His statue was erected next to the Şükrü Saracoğlu Stadium in 2009. He was buried in the Greek Orthodox cemetery on his native island.

Personal life
Lefter was born to Christofis Antoniadis, a fisherman, and Argyro Antoniadis on the island of Büyükada in Istanbul. He grew up with ten brothers and sisters, and was of Greek descent. One of his brothers, Panagis Antoniadis, played for Pera Club. His family took part in the exodus of ethnic Greeks from Turkey during his childhood - except for his father. Due to his small stature, the Turks gave him the nickname Küçük, Turkish for "The Small", and Lefter added it to his surname – Küçükandonyadis, meaning "The Small Antoniadis". He was married to a fellow Greek woman, Stavriani Bekiari, and they had three children.

Honours

Club

Fenerbahçe
 Süper Lig: 1959, 1960–61, 1963–64
 National Division: 1950
 Istanbul Football League: 1947–48, 1956–57, 1958–59
 Atatürk Cup: 1963–64

Individual
Turkish League top scorer: 1950, 1957–58
Istanbul League top scorer: 1947–48, 1953–54
Turkish Footballer of the Year: 1955

References

Bibliography

External links
 Official website of Fenerbahçe SK 

1925 births
2012 deaths
Turkish people of Greek descent
Turkish footballers
Turkey international footballers
Turkish football managers
Taksim SK footballers
Fenerbahçe S.K. footballers
ACF Fiorentina players
OGC Nice players
Serie A players
Ligue 1 players
Olympic footballers of Turkey
Footballers at the 1948 Summer Olympics
1954 FIFA World Cup players
AEK Athens F.C. players
Expatriate footballers in France
Turkish expatriate sportspeople in France
Expatriate footballers in Italy
Turkish expatriate sportspeople in Italy
Turkish expatriate footballers
Mersin İdman Yurdu managers
Sivasspor managers
Samsunspor managers
Footballers from Istanbul
Egaleo F.C. managers
SuperSport United F.C. managers
Orduspor managers
Association football forwards
Constantinopolitan Greeks